Josaphat-Robert Large (November 15, 1942 – October 28, 2017) was a Euro-Haitian-American poet, novelist and art critic. His novel Les terres entourées de larmes [Shore surrounded with tears] won the prestigious Prix littéraire des Caraïbes (Caribbean literary Prize) in 2003. He was nominated for the Haitian grand Literary Prize of 2004, together with Edwidge Danticat, René Depestre, Frankétienne, Gary Klang, Dany Laferrière and Leslie Manigat (ex-president of Haiti, the winner of the Prize).

Large was also one of the finalists at the Ushant (Ouessant in French) Literary Contest in 2002. He wrote in both French and Haitian Creole. Josaphat-Robert Large was a member of " La Société des Gens de Lettres de France" (Society of French intellectuals), of the "Association des Écrivains de langue française" (Association of writers of French origin) and of the PEN Club America. The Society of French and francophone teachers of America has organized two colloquium on his literary production (specially his novels), one at Florida International University in 2001 and one at Fordham University in 2006. Large also participated in the famous festival Étonnants-Voyageurs in 2007 and in 2008, he was one of the author in the great literary opening organized in Port-au-Prince by the Presses Nationales d'Haiti (National Press of Haiti).

Exile

Josaphat-Robert Large left Haiti at the end of 1963, after being arrested during a student strike against the regime of Papa Doc Duvalier. In New York, he studied English at Columbia University and photography at New York institute of Photography. He was a founding member of La Troupe de Théâtre Kouidor (Theatre group Kouidor) and frequently wrote for Haitian newspapers such as Haïti Progrès, Haïti en Marche, Le Nouvelliste and Lire Haiti.

Death
Large died of cancer in 2017.

Selected works
Nerfs du vent – Compilation of Poems, Paris, 1975. Rev. ed. Publisher: Ruptures, Washington DC, 2013
Chute de mots – Compilation of Poems, Paris, 1989
Les sentiers de l'enfer – Novel, Paris, 1990
Pè Sèt ! – Compilation of Poems Written in Creole, Miami, 1994, reed. 1996
Les récoltes de la folie – Novel, Paris, 1996
Les terres entourées de larmes – Novel, Paris, 2002
Keep on Keepin'On, English translation of Pè Sèt ! by Jack Hirschman, iUniverse, 2006
Rete! Kote Lamèsi – Novel written in Haitian Creole, Port-au-Prince, 2008.
Partir sur un coursier de nuages – Novel, Paris, 2008.
Échos en fuite – Compilation of Poems, Paris, 2010
Istwa Nanm Mwen – Compilation of Poems Written in Haitian Creole, Port-au-Prince, 2010
Jérémie et sa Verdoyante Grand'Anse – Photography and Poems, Coconut Creek, 2012
Le Domic'île – Compilation of Poems, New York, 2012
Rekot Powetik – Poems from Students of Ecole Normale de Marfranc, in French and Haitian Creole, Edited by Josaphat-R Large, Ruptures, Washington, 2013
Mississippi Blues – Novel, published by Ruptures, Washington, D.C., 2015

Compact discs
Eko Dlo [LaGrandans debòde] – Poems in Creole with background music by Haitian pianist Eddy Prophète, Montréal, 2006
5 Années de Textes et de Chansons des Vendredis littéraires, Poems in French and in Creole by Frankétienne, Lyonel Trouillot, Claude Pierre and Josaphat-Robert Large, August 2000.

Play
La voix du Bisaïeul – Play in French (Stage Director Max Kénol), New York July 1998
Dany Laferriere en pyjama – Presented at United Nations (Stage Director Max Kénol), New York, February 2014 
Les colis de la traite – Play written for La Semaine des victimes de l'esclavage for United Nations, (Stage Director Max Kénol), NY 2014

Short Story
Rosanna – Mystery fiction in "Haiti Noir", Edited by Edwidge Danticat, Akashic Books, New York, 2011
 Dark Days in Port-au-Prince, Exquisite Corpse, Part 5 by J-R Large, Part 2 by Ibi Zoboi,Part 1-6 by Roxane Gay, Part 3 by Jessica Fievre, Part 4 by K Ulysse, Akashic Books, Brooklyn, NY, 2014

Further reading

References & Studies
Frantz-Antoine Leconte Josaphat-Robert Large, la Fragmentation de l'être. L'Harmattan, Paris, Collection Espaces littéraires, January 2009.
Patrick Dorsainvil Josaphat-Robert Large, La grande première à New York.
DVD by Haitian Treasures, Brooklyn, 2010

Selected articles
Frantz-Antoine Leconte: Sur les traces de Josaphat-Robert Large, Colloquium at Fordham University, March 2006.
Hugues St-Fort: Histoire et Discours dans les Terres entourées de larmes de J-R Large, Colloquium at Fordham University, March 2006
Robenson Bernard: Un Roman ardent et lumineux, Le Nouvelliste, August 2008
Jean-Claude Charles: Un vrai écrivain dans la fausse maison de Mickey Mouse, Haiti-en-Marche #13, March 1996
Lyonel Trouillot: Lamèsi entre Rêve et Réalité, Le Matin, December 22–29, 2008

Awards
Prix littéraire des Caraïbes 2003 [Caribbean literary Prize] given by L'Association des Ecrivains de langue française (The Association of French writers)
Finaliste Concours Ouessant, 2002 (Finalist Ushant literary contest, in August 2002).
Nominated for Haitian Grand Literary Prize in 2004, at the Miami Book Fair International of 2004.
Finaliste Carbet Prize 2008 with Novel Partir sur un coursier de nuagesReferences

Further readingOpen Gate, An anthology of Haitian Creole Poetry, by Paul Laraque and Jack Hirschman, Curbstone Press, Willimantic, Connecticut, 2001. Literary criticism.Anthologie de la poésie haïtienne,[A Century of Haitian poets], by Rodney Saint-Eloi and Lyonel Trouillot, Mémoire d'encrier Montréal, 2003.Literary criticismFigures d'Haïti, [35 Poets for our time], by Jacques Rancourt, Le Temps des Cerises.  Paris, 2005. EssayWho is Who in Haitian Diaspora, Féquière Vilsaint & Maude Heurtelou,  EducaVision, Coconut Creek, 2008. EssayJosaphat-Robert Large, la Fragmentation de l'être'', editor: Frantz-Antoine Leconte, l'Harmattan, Paris, February 2009. Essay.

External links

Official Site: with breath taking photos of a few cities in Haiti 
Author file at île en île (in French): with biography, bibliography, links and audio recording
Poems by Josaphat-Robert Large and Félix Morisseau-Leroy translated into English, chosen by Mute Magazine of London to illustrate articles of Volume 2 #3 describing slums in places like Haiti and Brazil. Mute, volume 2 #3, August 2006. 
On a Publishers' Website in France :l'Harmattan

Videos
 (Talk with Anthony Phelps) (in French)
 (Reading of a poem in Creole by the author)
 (Reading of a poem in French by the author)
 (Talk with Gary Klang) (in French)
Josaphat-Robert Large answers to the 5 questions of Île en île. A 33-minute interview with professor Thomas C. Spear of CUNY, at the Schomburg Center for Research in Black Culture, on December 9, 2009. 

1942 births
2017 deaths
20th-century Haitian novelists
Haitian Creole-language writers
Haitian male novelists
Haitian people of European descent
Haitian emigrants to the United States
20th-century Haitian dramatists and playwrights
Haitian male dramatists and playwrights
Haitian writers in French
20th-century Haitian poets
Haitian male poets
21st-century Haitian novelists
21st-century Haitian poets
20th-century male writers
21st-century male writers
American writers in French
20th-century American writers
21st-century American writers
People from Jérémie